Santa Fe High School is a public high school located in Santa Fe Springs, California. The school has an enrollment of approximately 3,000 students and was founded in 1954 as a part of the Whittier Union High School District. It serves students in grades 9–12 in the cities of Santa Fe Springs, Norwalk, Downey, and Whittier.

Santa Fe was named a California Distinguished School in 2007.  For the 2009-2010 school year, Santa Fe met its Federal AYP; the school's  API score was 786  for that same year. Santa Fe's API Score for the 2010-2011 school year was 803, placing the school within the proficient range starting at 800.

Athletics
Santa Fe high school's mascot is the Chief, and the school colors are Black and Gold. Sports offered include wrestling, football, basketball, baseball, track, soccer, tennis, water polo, swimming, softball, volleyball, cross-country, cheerleading and golf.

Clubs and activities
Santa Fe High School also offers many clubs and sports and activities.  One of the many clubs available is FBLA (Future Business Leaders of America) which students from Santa Fe High school have partaken in and placed nationally in business competitions.  Another club is Santa Fe's ASB (Associated Student Body) which has won the California Student Activities Best Activities Program award (sponsored by CADA and CASL) for ten consecutive years.

Santa Fe Chieftain Tribe
The Chieftain Tribe marching band participates in marching band competitions, competing against other high schools in California.

Smaller subsets of the marching band are the wind ensemble, concert band, jazz band, winter drumline, and winter guard. These groups are usually active during the Winter/Spring semesters after the marching band/football season has ended.

Notable alumni 
Eric Bellinger - American singer, songwriter, and record producer
Joey Davis - former amateur wrestler and current mixed martial artist for Bellator MMA
Joe Gibbs - former head coach of the Washington Redskins
Steve Folsom - former NFL tight end for the Dallas Cowboys and Philadelphia Eagles
Tammy Jernigan - U.S. astronaut
Mark Kotsay - former MLB outfielder who last played for the San Diego Padres
Laura Berg - Olympic softball player and Head Coach for the Oregon State University Softball Team
Rod Barajas - former MLB catcher who last played for the Pittsburgh Pirates
Wayne Rainey - World Champion motorcycle racer
Randy Ramirez, Rocky Ramirez, Steven Goodwin - Formally of the band Hemme feat. Christy Hemme from TNA Impact
Ernie Iniguez - Drummer for Suicide Silence

References

External links
 

High schools in Los Angeles County, California
Public high schools in California
1954 establishments in California
Educational institutions established in 1954